Lalabad-e Olya (also Romanized as La‘lābād-e ‘Olyā; also known as Lālābād and La‘lābād-e Bālā) is a village in Miyan Darband Rural District, in the Central District of Kermanshah County, Kermanshah Province, Iran. At the 2006 census, its population was 73, in 16 families.

References 

Populated places in Kermanshah County